Carluke High School is a secondary school in Carluke, South Lanarkshire, Scotland.  its head teacher is Steve Duffy. As of 2007 it had 1,226 students. The school was rebuilt on the same site, beginning in 2005. The majority of the existing building was demolished. The Physical Education Block remains standing which now forms part of Carluke Leisure Centre.

References

External links
Carluke High School website  
Carluke High School's page on Scottish Schools Online

Carluke
Secondary schools in South Lanarkshire